Jack McVeigh (born 27 June 1996) is an Australian professional basketball player for USC Heidelberg of the Basketball Bundesliga.

Early life
McVeigh was born in Cabarita Beach, just 20km south of the Queensland-New South Wales border. He grew up on the Gold Coast where he attended The Southport School and began playing junior basketball at the age of five for the North Gold Coast Seahawks.

College career
McVeigh played college basketball with the Nebraska Cornhuskers for three seasons. McVeigh emerged as the team's sixth man during his sophomore season but a reduction in playing time during his junior season led to his departure from the team.

Professional career
On 23 April 2018, McVeigh returned to Australia and signed a three-year deal with the Adelaide 36ers of the National Basketball League. McVeigh averaged 9.4 points per game during the 2020–21 season.

On 9 April 2021, McVeigh signed with the North Adelaide Rockets of NBL1 Central for the 2021 NBL1 season.

On 6 July 2021, McVeigh signed a two-year deal with the Tasmania JackJumpers, a team entering the NBL for the first time in 2021–22.

On 21 January 2022, McVeigh signed with the North Gold Coast Seahawks of the NBL1 North for the 2022 season.

On 27 February 2023, McVeigh signed with USC Heidelberg of the Basketball Bundesliga.

Career statistics

College

|-
| style="text-align:left;"| 2015–16
| style="text-align:left;"| Nebraska
| 34 || 4 || 17.0 || .350 || .340 || .690 || 2.6 || 1.0 || .4 || .1 || 4.8
|-
| style="text-align:left;"| 2016–17
| style="text-align:left;"| Nebraska
| 30 || 11 || 22.9 || .372 || .338 || .780 || 2.5 || .6 || .5 || .3 || 7.5
|-
| style="text-align:left;"| 2017–18
| style="text-align:left;"| Nebraska
| 14 || 0 || 7.5 || .345 || .333 || 1.000 || 1.1 || .1 || .4 || .1 || 1.9
|- class="sortbottom"
| style="text-align:center;" colspan="2"| Career
| 78 || 15 || 17.6 || .361 || .339 || .746 || 2.3 || .7 || .4 || .2 || 5.3

References

External links
NBL profile
Nebraska Cornhuskers bio
College basketball statistics
Basketball Australia profile

1996 births
Living people
Sportspeople from the Gold Coast, Queensland
Adelaide 36ers players
Australian expatriate basketball people in Germany
Australian expatriate basketball people in the United States
Australian men's basketball players
Basketball players from Sydney
Nebraska Cornhuskers men's basketball players
People educated at Lake Ginninderra College
Small forwards
Tasmania JackJumpers players